Alexander Vasilyevich Terentyev (born 19 May 1999) is a Russian cross-country skier.

Cross-country skiing results
All results are sourced from the International Ski Federation (FIS).

Olympic Games
 2 medals – (2 bronze)

Distance reduced to 30 km due to weather conditions.

World Championships

World Cup

Season titles
 1 title – (1 U23)

Season standings

Individual podiums
 1 victory – (1 ) 
 1 podium – (1 )

Team podiums
 1 podium – (1 )

Notes

References

External links

1999 births
Living people
Russian male cross-country skiers
People from Naryan-Mar
Competitors at the 2019 Winter Universiade
Universiade gold medalists for Russia
Universiade medalists in cross-country skiing
Cross-country skiers at the 2022 Winter Olympics
Olympic cross-country skiers of Russia
Medalists at the 2022 Winter Olympics
Olympic medalists in cross-country skiing
Olympic bronze medalists for the Russian Olympic Committee athletes
Sportspeople from Nenets Autonomous Okrug